Tocantins Esporte Clube, commonly known as Tocantins or Tocantins de Miracema, is a Brazilian football club based in Miracema do Tocantins, Tocantins state.

Tocantins de Miracema is currently ranked sixth among Tocantins teams in CBF's national club ranking, at 228th place overall.

History
Tocantins was founded in 1993. In its history, the club was champion twice in the second division of Campeonato Tocantinense.

Stadium
Tocantins play their home games at Castanheirão. The stadium has a maximum capacity of 2,500 people.

References

External links
 Tocantins de Miracema in OGol.com

 
Association football clubs established in 1993
Football clubs in Tocantins
1993 establishments in Brazil